The 2005 Bank of the West Classic was a women's tennis tournament played on outdoor hard courts. It was part of the Tier II Series of the 2005 WTA Tour. It was the 34th edition of the tournament and took place at the Taube Tennis Center in Stanford, California, United States, from July 25 through July 31, 2005.

Finals

Singles

 Kim Clijsters defeated  Venus Williams 7–5, 6–2

Doubles

 Cara Black /  Rennae Stubbs defeated  Elena Likhovtseva /  Vera Zvonareva 6–3, 7–5

Bank of the West Classic
Silicon Valley Classic
Bank of the West Classic
Bank of the West Classic
Bank of the West Classic